Pont Cysyllte,  also known as Cysylltau Bridge or Bont Bridge, is a 17th-century road bridge crossing the River Dee near the village of Trevor, Wrexham County Borough, Wales. It lies 200 m west of Thomas Telford's Pontcysyllte Aqueduct and, carrying the B5434 road, is the main connection between Trevor and nearby Froncysyllte.

The sandstone bridge is dated '1697', though it was substantially rebuilt during the 18th century, and only the south arch and part of the south pier are original. The bridge comprises three arches, with full-height triangular cutwaters between each arch, each topped by a pedestrian refuge.

The bridge became a Grade I listed structure in 1963 and is also a scheduled monument.

The bridge has been regularly damaged by motor vehicles being, at its narrowest, only  feet wide. Vehicles are supposed to stop before crossing and give priority to any oncoming vehicle already on the bridge.

References

Bridges across the River Dee, Wales
Cysylltau
Bridges completed in 1697
Grade I listed bridges in Wales
Grade I listed buildings in Wrexham County Borough
Road bridges in Wales